Ovifat is a village of Wallonia in the municipality of Waimes, district of Robertville, located in the province of Liège, Belgium.

The population is about 500. Its inhabitants are nicknamed Baras (rams).

Waimes
Populated places in Liège Province
Ski areas and resorts in Belgium